Malefiloane Airstrip  is a high elevation airstrip serving the village of Malefiloane in Mokhotlong District, Lesotho. The runway is on a ridge above the Mokhotlong River valley.

There is higher terrain to the west.

See also

Transport in Lesotho
List of airports in Lesotho

References

External links
 Malefiloane
 HERE Maps - Malefiloane
 OpenStreetMap - Malefiloane
 OurAirports - Malefiloane
 

Airports in Lesotho